YAG 300 (Yard Auxiliary, General) vessels were a series of ten wooden boats built between 1954 and 1955 that throughout their service acted as yard ferries (Blue Boats), training platforms and test beds for route survey equipment with the Royal Canadian Navy (RCN). 

Unofficially known as Canadian Forces Auxiliary Vessels (CFAV), the 75-foot boats primarily served as at-sea training platforms for junior naval officers, boatswains, reserve personnel and Sea Cadets at Canadian Forces Base (CFB) Esquimalt until they were taken out of service in 2007. According to the Department of National Defence, "in 2000, a total of 1830 personnel were deployed on the YAGs for a total of 585 days and steamed over 25,000 nautical miles (46,000 km) in support of training."

Design and layout
The boats were 75′ long overall, 18′6″ wide, had a draft of 4′6″, measured 70 tonnes, and were all powered by twin 6-71 Detroit Diesel engines. The boats were arranged in typical naval fashion with officers housed forward with the galley and their own head, an engine room amidships, and cadet room aft with 12-14 bunks in double tiers. The heads are equipped with a pump-action lever, that could be used to pump sewage into the black water tanks held aboard or into the ocean water. Above decks was the wheelhouse mounted on the forward cabin's coaming; abaft that, the exposed breezeway; and, mounted on the after cabin's coaming, a Zodiac launch as well as a food locker and barbecue. Above the wheelhouse was an open bridge, fitted with a chart table and a gyrocompass repeater. A second gyro repeater was fitted on the quarterdeck. Each YAG was equipped with a Furuno 1831 navigation radar, with the display located in the wheelhouse.

Retirement
Before being put on the auction block, the 57-year old vessels were stripped of all military equipment and then environmentally assessed for sale. Six YAGs and one yard diving tender were auctioned off to buyers on Vancouver Island and Vancouver. Selling prices varied for each vessel depending on the intensity of the bidding. 

The Canadian Government sold all six vessels for $26,537.80 CAD, with an average sale price of $4,422.96 CAD. The most expensive ship sold (YAG 320 Lynx) sold for more than $11,000.  The YAG 300 series were replaced by the Orca-class tenders.

List of YAG vessels (1954-2007)

Gallery

References

External links

 Yard Auxiliary General Info
Yard Craft and Other Small Craft Built Since WWII

YAG 308

 YAG 308 profile on Nauticapedia
 YAG 308 profile on Shipspotting.com

YAG 312

 YAG 312 Profile page at For Posterity's Sake A Royal Canadian Navy Historical Project
 YAG 312 Profile Page at The Nauticapedia
 Photo of YAG 312 on shipspotting.com
 Photo of YAG 312 on Flickr
 YAG 312 in civilian ownership (YouTube)

YAG 314

YAG 314 Profile page at The Nauticapedia
m/v Tamarind

YFP 316

 A shining star in a sea of blue
YAG 316 in civilian ownership (YouTube)

YAG 319

Tiicmis Wilderness & Wellness Retreats
AirBnB Listing

Get hitched aboard the "YAG Badger 319" in the Broken Group Islands

YAG 320

 YAG 320 Profile page at For Posterity's Sake A Royal Canadian Navy Historical Project
 YAG 320 Lynx in Seattle, WA 1984

Training ships of the Royal Canadian Navy